Mount Evans is a mountain with a double summit rising to , dominating the central part of the Saint Johns Range in Victoria Land. It was discovered by the British National Antarctic Expedition (1901–04) under Scott, who named it for Lieutenant Edward R.G.R. Evans (later Admiral Lord Mountevans). Evans was an officer aboard the relief ship SY Morning and later joined Scott for the Terra Nova Expedition. He  took his title Mountevans from the name of the mountain.

References

Evans